The Eighth Canadian Ministry was the cabinet chaired by Prime Minister Sir Wilfrid Laurier.  It governed Canada from 11 July 1896 to 5 October 1911, including all of the 8th, 9th, 10th, and 11th Canadian Parliaments.  The government was formed by the Liberal Party of Canada.

The Cabinet
Prime Minister
11 July 1896 – 10 October 1911: Sir Wilfrid Laurier
Minister of Agriculture
11 July 1896 – 10 October 1911: Sydney Arthur Fisher
Minister of Customs
30 June 1897 – 10 October 1911: William Paterson
Secretary of State for External Affairs
19 May 1909 – 10 October 1911: Charles Murphy
Minister of Finance
11 July 1896 – 20 July 1896: Vacant (John Mortimer Courtney was acting)
20 July 1896 – 10 October 1911: William Stevens Fielding
Receiver General of Canada
11 July 1896 – 10 October 1911: The Minister of Finance (Ex officio)
11 July 1896 – 20 July 1896: Vacant (John Mortimer Courtney was acting)
20 July 1896 – 10 October 1911: William Stevens Fielding
Superintendent-General of Indian Affairs
11 July 1896 – 10 October 1911: The Minister of the Interior (Ex officio)
11 July 1896 – 17 July 1896: Vacant  (Hayter Reed was acting)
17 July 1896 – 17 November 1896: Richard William Scott (acting)
17 November 1896 – 28 February 1905: Clifford Sifton
28 February 1905 – 13 March 1905: Vacant (Francis Pedley was acting)
13 March 1905 – 8 April 1905: Sir Wilfrid Laurier
8 April 1905 – 10 October 1911: Frank Oliver
Minister of Inland Revenue 
30 June 1897 – 22 June 1900: Sir Henri-Gustave Joly de Lotbinière
22 June 1900 – 19 January 1904: Michel-Esdras Bernier
19 January 1904 – 6 February 1906: Louis-Philippe Brodeur
6 February 1906 – 10 October 1911: William Templeman
Minister of the Interior
11 July 1896 – 17 July 1896: Vacant (Alexander Mackinnon Burgess was acting)
17 July 1896 – 17 November 1896: Richard William Scott (acting)
17 November 1896 – 28 February 1905: Clifford Sifton
28 February 1905 – 13 March 1905: Vacant (William Wallace Cory was acting)
13 March 1905 – 8 April 1905: Sir Wilfrid Laurier
8 April 1905 – 10 October 1911: Frank Oliver
Minister of Justice
11 July 1896 – 18 November 1897: Sir Oliver Mowat
18 November 1897 – 8 February 1902: David Mills
8 February 1902 – 4 June 1906: Charles Fitzpatrick
4 June 1906 – 10 October 1911: Sir Allen Bristol Aylesworth
Attorney General of Canada
11 July 1896 – 10 October 1911: The Minister of Justice (Ex officio)
11 July 1896 – 18 November 1897: Sir Oliver Mowat
18 November 1897 – 8 February 1902: David Mills
8 February 1902 – 4 June 1906: Charles Fitzpatrick
4 June 1906 – 10 October 1911: Allen Bristol Aylesworth
Minister of Labour 
19 May 1909 – 2 June 1909: Vacant (William Lyon Mackenzie King was acting)
2 June 1909 – 10 October 1911: William Lyon Mackenzie King
Leader of the Government in the Senate
11 July 1896 – 18 November 1897: Sir Oliver Mowat
18 November 1897 – 7 February 1902: David Mills
7 February 1902 – 20 January 1909: Richard William Scott
20 January 1909 – 10 October 1911: Richard John Cartwright
Minister of Marine and Fisheries
11 July 1896 – 25 September 1901: Sir Louis Henry Davies
25 September 1901 – 15 January 1902: Vacant (François Frédéric Gourdeau was acting)
15 January 1902 – 11 November 1902: James Sutherland
11 November 1902 – 26 December 1905: Raymond Préfontaine
26 December 1905 – 6 January 1906: Vacant (François Frédéric Gourdeau was acting)
6 January 1906 – 6 February 1906: Sir Wilfrid Laurier
6 February 1906 – 11 August 1911: Louis-Philippe Brodeur
11 August 1911 – 10 October 1911: Rodolphe Lemieux
Minister of Militia and Defence 
11 July 1896 – 10 October 1911: Sir Frederick William Borden
Minister of Mines
27 April 1907 – 3 May 1907: Vacant (Albert Peter Low was acting)
3 May 1907 – 10 October 1911: William Templeman
Minister of the Naval Service 
4 May 1910 – 11 August 1911: Louis-Philippe Brodeur
11 August 1911 – 10 October 1911: Rodolphe Lemieux
Postmaster General
11 July 1896 – 16 October 1905: Sir William Mulock
16 October 1905 – 4 June 1906: Allen Bristol Aylesworth
4 June 1906 – 19 August 1911: Rodolphe Lemieux
19 August 1911 – 10 October 1911: Henri Sévérin Béland
President of the Privy Council
11 July 1896 – 10 October 1911: Sir Wilfrid Laurier
Minister of Public Works
11 July 1896 – 22 October 1902: Joseph-Israël Tarte
22 October 1902 – 11 November 1902: Vacant (Sir Wilfrid Laurier was acting)
11 November 1902 – 4 May 1905: James Sutherland
4 May 1905 – 22 May 1905: Vacant (Sir Wilfrid Laurier was acting)
22 May 1905 – 30 August 1907: Charles Smith Hyman
30 August 1907 – 10 October 1911: William Pugsley
Minister of Railways and Canals
11 July 1896 – 20 July 1896: Vacant (Collingwood Schreiber was acting)
20 July 1896 – 21 July 1903: Andrew George Blair
21 July 1903 – 15 January 1904: William Stevens Fielding
15 January 1904 – 3 April 1907: Henry Emmerson
3 April 1907 – 9 April 1907: Vacant (Matthew Joseph Butler was acting)
9 April 1907 – 10 October 1911: George Perry Graham
Secretary of State of Canada
11 July 1896 – 9 October 1908: Richard William Scott
9 October 1908 – 10 October 1911: Charles Murphy
Registrar General of Canada
11 July 1896 – 10 October 1911: The Secretary of State of Canada (Ex officio)
11 July 1896 – 9 October 1908: Richard William Scott
9 October 1908 – 10 October 1911: Charles Murphy
Minister of Trade and Commerce
11 July 1896 – 10 October 1911: Sir Richard John Cartwright
Minister without Portfolio 
11 July 1896 – 12 January 1902: Richard Reid Dobell
21 August 1896 – 19 July 1899: Christophe-Alphonse Geoffrion
30 September 1899 – 15 January 1902: James Sutherland
25 February 1902 – 6 February 1906: Charles Smith Hyman
5 February 1904 – 22 May 1905: William Templeman

Offices not of the Cabinet
Controller of Customs
11 July 1896 – 30 June 1897: William Paterson

Controller of Inland Revenue
11 July 1896 – 30 June 1897: Sir Henri-Gustave Joly de Lotbinière

Solicitor General of Canada
11 July 1896 – 10 February 1902: Charles Fitzpatrick
10 February 1902 – 29 January 1904: Henry George Carroll
29 January 1904 – 4 June 1906: Rodolphe Lemieux
4 June 1906 – 14 February 1907: Vacant
14 February 1907 – 10 October 1911: Jacques Bureau

References

Succession

08
1896 establishments in Canada
1911 disestablishments in Canada
Cabinets established in 1896
Cabinets disestablished in 1911
Ministries of Queen Victoria
Ministries of Edward VII
Ministries of George V